Teamtheater is a theatre in Munich, Bavaria, Germany former known as Theater am Einlaß.

Theatres in Munich